Nathaniel Borradaile Browne (1819-1875) was a lawyer, financier, and government official in Philadelphia, Pennsylvania.

Born in Philadelphia, he helped found the Fidelity Trust Company in 1866 and worked on the 1876 Centennial Exposition in Fairmount Park. He represented a Philadelphia district in the Pennsylvania state legislature and was appointed Postmaster of Philadelphia on March 30, 1859.

His papers are today preserved at the University of Delaware in Newark, Delaware.

Notes

1819 births
1875 deaths
Lawyers from Philadelphia
American financiers
19th-century American lawyers
19th-century American businesspeople